Bjarne Edgar Grottum (August 9, 1893 — October 4, 1987) was an American attorney who served as state senator for Minnesota's 10th district serving Cottonwood and Jackson counties.

Grottum was born in Minneapolis, Minnesota and raised on a farm in Jackson, Minnesota.  He served in the U.S. Army during World War I. In 1920, he graduated from the 	University of Minnesota Law School.

He served in the senate from 1947—1954 as a member of the Minnesota Democratic–Farmer–Labor Party (DFLer) but "caucused with the Conservative majority of the Senate" and later stated that the "Legislature should be truly nonpartisan".  He was preceded by Ole Finstad and succeeded by Walter Franz  In addition to his work in the senate, he served as County Attorney for Jackson County for 12 years and served on the Board of Regents at the University of Minnesota (1961-1967).  He died in Mesa, Arizona and was buried in the Delafield Cemetery in Jackson County, Minnesota.

References

1893 births
1987 deaths
People from Jackson, Minnesota
Lawyers from Minneapolis
Politicians from Minneapolis
Military personnel from Minnesota
University of Minnesota Law School alumni
Minnesota state senators
20th-century American politicians
American people of Norwegian descent
20th-century American lawyers